Ramage may refer to:

People
 Adam Ramage (1772-1850), printing press manufacturer
 Alan Ramage (born 1957), English cricketer
 Alison Ramage, British mathematician
 Andy Ramage (born 1974), English footballer
 Cecil Ramage (1895–1988),  Scottish barrister, actor and Liberal politician
 Craig Ramage (born 1970), English footballer
 David Ramage (born 1939),  Australian rower
 Craufurd Tait Ramage (1803–1878), Scottish travel writer and anthologist
 Edward V. Ramage (1908–1981), US Presbyterian Church minister
 Fiona Ramage (born 1978), New Zealand cyclist
 George Ramage (born 1937), Scottish footballer
 Graeme Ramage (born 1992), Scottish footballer
 Henry Ramage (1827–1859), Scottish dragoon and Victoria Cross recipient
 Ian Ramage (born 1958), Scottish cricket umpire
 James D. Ramage (1916–2012), US Navy Rear Admiral
 John Ramage (artist) (1748–1802), Irish-American painter
 John Ramage (ice hockey) (born 1991), Canadian-American ice hockey player
 Lawson P. Ramage (1909–1990), Vice Admiral and noted submarine commander during World War II
 Pat Ramage (1922–2003), Canadian skiing executive
 Paul Ramage (born 1940), English cricketer and headmaster
 Peter Ramage (1908–1982), Scottish footballer
 Peter Ramage (born 1983), English footballer
 Rob Ramage (born 1959), Canadian ice hockey player
 Richard Ramage (1896–1971), British colonial administrator.
 Robert Ramage (1865–1925), Australian jockey

Places

 Ramage Point, an ice-covered point on Carney Island, Antarctica
 Ramage, West Virginia, an unincorporated community in West Virginia, United States

Other uses

 James A. Ramage Civil War Museum, museum in Northern Kentucky
 Nicholas Ramage, a character in Dudley Pope's Ramage series of historical novels
 Ramage (novel), the first novel in the Ramage series
 Ramage & Ferguson, Scottish shipbuilding company
 , a guided missile destroyer in the United States Navy